Venue is the location at which an event takes place. It may refer to:

Locations 
 Venue (law), the place a case is heard
 Financial trading venue, a place or system where financial transactions can occur 
 Music venue, place used for a concert or musical performance
 Sport venue, place used for a sporting event
 Theater (structure), or venue, a place used for performing theater

Other uses 
 Venue (magazine), the "what's on" magazine for the Bristol and Bath areas of the UK
 Venue (sound system), a brand of live sound mixing consoles
 Dell Venue, an Android smartphone manufactured by Dell
 Hyundai Venue, a car model manufactured by Hyundai Motor Company

See also
 The Venue (disambiguation)